The Whitefish River is a  long river in Thunder Bay District in northwestern Ontario, Canada. It is in the Lake Superior drainage basin, is a tributary of the Kaministiquia River, and is in the centre of the Whitefish River Valley which is the location of several small settlements that grew along the Port Arthur, Duluth and Western Railway.

Course
It continues northeast through the townships of Gillies, O'Connor and Oliver Paipoonge, and reaches its mouth at the Kaministiquia River, which empties into Thunder Bay on Lake Superior.

Tributaries
Cedar Creek (left)
Whitewood Creek (left)
Silver Creek (right)
Sitch Creek (right)
Silver Falls Creek (right)
Beaver Creek (right)
North River (left)

See also
List of rivers of Ontario

References

Sources

Rivers of Thunder Bay District
Kaministiquia River